Benched is a 2018 American sports drama film directed by Robert Deaton and George Flanigen and written by Richard Dresser, based on his play Rounding Third. The film stars John C. McGinley and Garret Dillahunt. Fred Roos was the producer, while Deaton and Flanigen made their feature film directing debut. It was released on August 17, 2018.

Cast 
 John C. McGinley as Don
 Garret Dillahunt as Michael
Darius Willis as Pete
Carter Wallace as Rusty
Jlynn Johnson as Carolyn
Graham Schneider as Jimmy
Keith Jamal Evans as Kahil
Brogan Hall as Timmy
Reid Murray as Opposing Player
Hadley Maxwell as Opposing Player

Production 
Principal photography on the film began in July 2015 in Nashville, Tennessee.

References

External links 
 

2018 films
Films shot in Tennessee
Films set in Tennessee
American baseball films
American sports drama films
2010s sports drama films
2018 directorial debut films
2018 drama films
2010s English-language films
2010s American films